Luis de Meyer (born 1903, date of death unknown) was an Argentine cyclist. He competed in three events at the 1924 Summer Olympics and two events at the 1928 Summer Olympics.

References

External links
 

1903 births
Year of death missing
Argentine male cyclists
Olympic cyclists of Argentina
Cyclists at the 1924 Summer Olympics
Cyclists at the 1928 Summer Olympics
Place of birth missing